The following is a list of notable people who were born in, or have been residents of, or otherwise closely associated with the American city of Malibu, California. The listed people are Americans unless otherwise noted.

A
Cisco Adler musician
Rick Allen British drummer; Def Leppard
Paul AlmondCanadian filmmaker and novelist
Herb Alpert musician, founder of A&M Records
Carlos Amezcua Los Angeles television news anchor
Pamela Anderson Canadian-born actress
Richard Dean Anderson actor
Angelyne singer and model
Jennifer Aniston actress
Rachel Ashwell English-born author, designer, entrepreneur
Emilie Autumn singer

B
Simon Baker actor
Lucinda Bassett motivational speaker
Beck musician
Kristen Bell actress
Justin Berfield actor, producer and writer
Halle Berry actress
Valerie Bertinelli actress
Emily Blunt English actress
Ben Bostrom motorcycle racer
Clara Bow actress
Ryan Braun professional baseball player
Jeff Bridges actor
James Brolin actor, producer and director
Charles Bronson (deceased) actor
Mel Brooks film director, producer, and writer
Pierce Brosnan Irish actor
Bruce Buffer UFC announcer
Geneviève Bujold actress
Mark Burnett British-born director, producer

C
Colbie Caillat singer
Dean Cain actor
James Cameron Canadian-born director and producer
Dyan Cannon actress
Adam Carolla comedian
Jim Carrey Canadian-American actor
Colette Carr singer and rapper
Johnny Carson (deceased)  talk show host
Chris Chelios retired NHL player
Cher singer, actress
Dick Clark (deceased)  television personality; businessman
Jackie Collins (deceased)  British novelist
Carl Colpaert director; founder of Cineville
Lauren Conrad reality-television personality
Robert Conrad (deceased)  actor
Courteney Cox actress
Cindy Crawford supermodel
Leo Cullum (deceased)  cartoonist, best known for his work in The New Yorker
John Cusack actor
Miley Cyrus singer

D
Tony Danza actor
Bette Davis (deceased)  actress
Eileen Davidson actress, reality star
Olivia De Berardinis pin-up artist
Giada De Laurentiis Italian television chef
Lana Del Rey singer
Patrick Dempsey actor
Bruce Dern actor
Laura Dern actress
Danny DeVito actor, director, producer
Leonardo DiCaprio actor
Joan Didion (deceased)  writer
Shannen Doherty actress
Stephen Dorff actor
Robert Downey, Jr. actor
Roma Downey actress
Fran Drescher actress, author, producer
David DreierU.S. congressman, chairman of Tribune Publishing Company
Minnie Driver actress
David Duchovny actor
Bob Dylan singer

E
Sam Elliott actor
David Ellison film producer, founder of Skydance Productions
Lawrence Ellison businessman, founder of Oracle Corporation
Megan Ellison film producer, founder of Annapurna Pictures
Cary Elwes actor
Emilio Estevez actor, director
Melissa Etheridge singer

F
Tami Farrell Miss Teen USA 2003, Miss California USA 2009
Norman Fell (deceased)  actor
Sally Field actress
Erin Fitzgerald voice actress
Joe Flanigan actor
John Fante writer
Jane Fonda actress

G
Kenny G saxophonist
Lady Gaga singer, songwriter
John A. Garcia chief executive officer of Novalogic Inc., philanthropist
James Garner (deceased)  actor, The Rockford Files
Kevin Garnett NBA basketball player
Brad Garrett actor
David Geffen producer, record producer
Richard Gere actor
Mel Gibson actor, director, producer
Brad Gilbert (born 1961) tennis coach, television tennis commentator, and former professional tennis player
Glaser-Kochavi family business family
Whoopi Goldberg actress, comedian
Taylor Goldsmith singer, songwriter, Dawes
Louis Gossett Jr. actor, Roots
Thomas Gottschalk German radio host, television host, entertainer, actor
Camille Grammer ex-wife of actor Kelsey Grammer, former castmate of The Real Housewives of Beverly Hills, dancer and model
Kelsey Grammer  actor, Dr. Frasier Crane on TV's Cheers and Frasier
Josh Groban singer
Matt Groening cartoonist of The Simpsons and Futurama

H
Gigi Hadid model
Larry Hagman (deceased)  actor
Mark Hamill actor
Laird Hamilton surfer
Tom Hanks actor, producer
Ed Harris actor
Goldie Hawn actress
David Hemmings British actor
Don Henley musician, co-founder of the Eagles
Henry Hill (deceased)  gangster
Paris Hilton heiress
Dustin Hoffman actor
Anthony Hopkins Welsh actor
Kate Hudson actress
Jim Hutton (deceased)  actor
Timothy Hutton actor, producer and director

I
Tris Imboden drummer for Southern California rock band Honk, and for jazz-fusion and pop band Chicago

J
Janet Jackson singer, actress
David Janssen (deceased) actor
Brody Jenner reality-television personality
Dakota Johnson actress
Angelina Jolie actress
Jennifer Jones (deceased)  actress 
John Paul Larkin (deceased)
Jaden Smith  actor and rapper

K
Terry Kath (deceased) guitarist, singer-songwriter of Chicago
Jeffrey Katzenberg producer
Stacy Keach actor
Brian Keith (deceased)  actor
Miranda Kerr model
Anthony Kiedis frontman of the Red Hot Chili Peppers
Jimmy Kimmel comedian, television presenter
Suge Knight chief executive officer of Death Row Records
John Krasinski actor
Thomas Kretschmann German actor
Chantal Kreviazuk Canadian singer-songwriter
Kris Kristofferson actor, singer-songwriter

L
Michael Landon (deceased)  actor
Angela Lansbury (deceased)  actress, singer
Chloe Lattanzi singer; daughter of Matt Lattanzi and Olivia Newton-John
Matt Lattanzi actor; former husband of Olivia Newton-John
Jane Leeves English actress
Louis Leithold (deceased)  scholar and writer; wrote The Calculus, a widely used high school and college calculus textbook
Jack Lemmon (deceased)  actor
Téa Leoni actress
David Letterman talk show host, comedian 
Brian "Limmy" Limond Scottish variety entertainer 
Richard Littlejohn English journalist
Sandra Tsing Loh writer
Rob Lowe actor
John Lydon (also known as Johnny Rotten) British-Irish singer

M
Ali MacGraw actress
Shirley MacLaine actress
Amy Madigan actress
Lee Majors actor
Howie Mandel actor, comedian, game show host
Dinah Manoff actress
Alden Marin painter, poet
Shannon Marketic model, Miss California USA 1992 and Miss USA 1992
Merrill Markoe writer
Chris Martin British singer, frontman of Coldplay
Nan Martin (deceased)  actress
Walter Matthau (deceased)  actor
Dave McCary comedian, writer, director 
Matthew McConaughey actor
John C. McGinley actor
Scott Menville voice actor, singer
Reggie Miller retired NBA player
Brian Moore (deceased)  Northern Ireland-Canadian novelist, screenwriter and journalist
Demi Moore actress
Alanis Morissette Canadian singer-songwriter
Eddie Murphy actor
Bill Murray actor, comedian

N
Randy Nauert (deceased)  musician, co-founder and bassist for the surf rock band The Challengers
Jack Nicholson actor
Nick Nolte actor
Olivia Newton-John (deceased) (Past Resident) - Australian singer, actress

O
Merle Oberon (deceased)  actress
Carroll O'Connor (deceased)  actor
Edna May Oliver (deceased)  actress
Tatum O'Neal actress
Roy Orbison (deceased)  country/rockabilly singer-songwriter, guitarist

P
Jimmy Page British guitarist; Led Zeppelin
Brad Paisley country music singer
Gary Pattersonartist
Sean Penn actor, director
William Phipps actor, film producer
Pink singer
Brad Pitt actor
Ael Ma PJ business magnate, social reformer
Eve Plumb actress 
Donald Prell WWII veteran, venture capitalist
Victoria Principal actress
Tom Petty (deceased)  American musician; Tom Petty & The Heartbreakers

Q
Kathleen Quinlanactress
Martha Quinn actress, original MTV VJ and Sirius satellite radio show host

R
Prem Rawat Indian American inspirational speaker and former guru 
Robert Redford actor, director
Nick Richards singer 
Rihanna  singer-songwriter, actress, model, fashion designer
Linda Ronstadt singer 
Axl Rose singer 
Edward P. Roski chief executive officer and chairman, Majestic Realty Co. 
Diana Ross singer, actress 
Katharine Ross actress 
Rick Rubin record producer; co-president, Columbia Records 
Kurt Russell actor

S
Niamh Sarno actress, comedian, model
Tom Schaar skateboarder
George C. Scott (deceased)  actor
Jane Seymour British actress
Tom Shadyacdirector
Charlie Sheen
Martin Sheen actor
Shwayze singer
Frank Sinatra (deceased)  singer, actor
Grace Slick singer
Jaden Smith actor
Suzanne Somers actress, entrepreneur
David Spade actor, comedian
Britney Spears singer, actress
Steven Spielberg director
Rick Springfield Australian-American singer and actor
Sylvester Stallone actor
John Stamos actor
Barbara Stanwyck (deceased)  actress
Rod Steiger (deceased)  actor
Donald Sterling businessman; owner of Los Angeles Clippers
Jeffrey Stibel entrepreneur
Sting British singer and composer
Emma Stone actress
Yvonne Strahovski Australian actress
Barbra Streisand singer, actress
Dominique Swain actress
Gloria Swanson (deceased) actress

T
Charlize Theron South African-American actress 
Jonathan Taylor Thomas actor
Sandi Thom  singer
John Travolta actor
Cicely Tyson (deceased)  actress

V
Dick Van Dyke actor, comedian
Eddie Van Halen (deceased)  guitarist; Van Halen
Vince Van Patten television presenter
Emmanuel Villaume conductor
Jan-Michael Vincent (deceased) actor
Lexi VonderLieth  professional surfer
Andrew von Oeyen  concert pianist

W
Rachel Ward actress
Jordan Wilimovsky Olympic pool and open water swimmer
Kimberly Williams-Paisley actress
Bruce Willis actor
Flip Wilson (deceased) comedian, actor, host of The Flip Wilson Show
William Wyler (deceased) director

Z
Roxana Zal actress

See also

 List of people from California

References

 
Lists of people by city in the United States
Lists of people from California